The Wheeler Shale (named by Charles Walcott) is a Cambrian ( 507 Ma) fossil locality world-famous
for prolific agnostid and Elrathia kingii trilobite remains (even though many areas are barren of fossils)
and represents a Konzentrat-Lagerstätte. Varied soft bodied organisms are locally preserved, a fauna (including Naraoia, Wiwaxia and Hallucigenia) and preservation style (carbonaceous film) normally associated with the more famous Burgess Shale. As such, the Wheeler Shale also represents a Konservat-Lagerstätten.

Together with the Marjum Formation and lower Weeks Formation, the Wheeler Shale forms  of limestone and shale exposed in one of the thickest, most fossiliferous and best exposed sequences of Middle Cambrian rocks in North America.

At the type locality of Wheeler Amphitheater, House Range, Millard County, western Utah, the Wheeler Shale consists of a heterogeneous succession of highly calcareous shale, shaley limestone, mudstone and thin, flaggy limestone. The Wheeler Formation (although the Marjum & Weeks Formations are missing) extends into the Drum Mountains, northwest of the House Range where similar fossils and preservation are found.

Taphonomy and sedimentology

Detailed work recognises a number of ~10 m thick lagerstätten sequences in the formation, each of which formed at a sea-level high stand in deep water. The lagerstätte were deposited by turbidities and mudslides onto an oxygenated sea floor.
The productive layers comprise mud and clay particles, with a tiny fraction of wind-blown quartz.

Stratigraphy 

The Wheeler Shale spans the Ptychagnostus atavus and uppermost-Middle Cambrian Bolaspidella trilobite zones  (See House Range) for full stratigraphy).

Fauna

 
Incomplete list of the fauna of the Wheeler Shale:
(Note: the preservation of hard bodied trilobite remains and soft bodied animals seems to be mutually exclusive within particular horizons.)

Protista
Marpolia spissa - cyanobacteria or green algae
Morania fragmenta - cyanobacteria

Arthropoda
Branchiocaris pretiosa - hymenocarine
Branchiocaris sp.
Cambropodus gracilis - uniramian
Canadaspis perfecta - hymenocarine
Dicerocaris opisthoeces
Emeraldella brocki - vicissicaudatan
Isoxys 
Perspicaris dilatus hymenocarine
Pseudoarctolepis sharpi - possible hymenocarine
Tuzoia? peterseni hymenocarine
Waptia fieldensis hymenocarine

Alalcomenaeus cambricus - megacheiran; or alalcomenaeid
Dicranocaris guntherorum - megacheiran; or alalcomenaeid
unnamed 'Molli Sonia symmetrica'
Leanchoilia superlata - megacheiran
Sidneyia inexpectans - vicissicaudatan

Dinocaridida 
Amplectobelua cf. A. stephenensis – radiodont
Anomalocarididae gen. et sp. nov. - radiodont
Buccaspinea cooperi? - radiodont
Caryosyntrips durus - radiodont
Caryosyntrips serratus - radiodont
Peytoia nathorsti - radiodont
Pahvantia hastata - radiodont
Stanleycaris sp. - radiodont
Utaurora comosa - opabiniid

Trilobita
Naraoia compacta - naraoiid nectaspid
Hypagnostus parvifrons - agnostid
Peronopsis amplaxis - peronopsid agnostid
Peronopsis bidens
Peronopsis fallax
Peronopsis gaspensis
Peronopsis intermedius
Peronopsis interstrictus
Peronopsis montis
Peronopsis segmentis
Ptychagnostus atavus (= Acidusus atavus) - ptychagnostid agnostid
Ptychagnostus germanus
Ptychagnostus gibbus
Ptychagnostus intermedius
Ptychagnostus michaeli
Ptychagnostus occultatus
Ptychagnostus seminula
Glyphaspis concavus - asaphid
Bathyuriscus fimbriatus - dolichometopid corynexochid
Bathyuriscus sp.
Kootenia sp. - dorypygid corynexochid, perhaps a synonym of Olenoides
Olenoides expansus - dorypygid corynexochid
Olenoides nevadensis
Olenoides serratus
Tonkinella breviceps
Zacanthoides divergens - zacanthoidid corynexochid
Zacanthoides sp.
Altiocculus harrisi - ptychopariid (specific name may be confused with Alokistocare)
Alokistocare harrisi - alokistocarid ptychopariid
Asaphiscus wheeleri - ptychopariid; second-most common species in the formation
Bathyocos housensis - ptychopariid
Bolaspidella drumensis
Bolaspidella housensis
Bolaspidella sp.
Bolaspidella wellsvillensis
Brachyaspidion microps
Brachyaspidion sulcatum
Cedaria minor - known from the Warrior Formation
Elrathia kingii - alokistocarid ptychopariid
Elrathia sp.
Elrathina wheeleri = Ptychoparella wheeleri? - ptychopariid
Jenkinsonia varga
Modocia brevispina
Modocia laevinucha
Modocia typicalis
Ptychoparella sp. - ptychopariid
Ptychoparella wheeleri
Spencella sp. - ptychopariid

Brachiopoda
Acrothele subsidua

Chordata
Hertzina sp. - conodont

Cnidaria
Cambromedusa sp. - jellyfish

Mollusca
Pelagiella sp. - pelagiellid helcionelloid

Echinodermata
Castericystis sprinklei - carpoid
Castericystis sp.
Cothurnocystis sp. - stylophoran
Ctenocystis sp. - ctenocystoid
Gogia spiralis - eocrinoid
Eocrinoid holdfasts believed to belong to Gogia spiralis; may belong to other species

Porifera
Choia carteri - choiid monaxonid demosponge
Choia utahensis
Crumillospongia sp. - hazeliid monaxonid demosponge
Diagonella sp.

Priapulida
Ottoia prolifica - a stem group and it was an archaeopriapulid
Selkirkia sp. - archaeopriapulid
"Selkirkia willoughbyi" (Note: S. columbia is the only recognized species)

Unclassified
Hallucigenia sparsa - ?xenusiid lobopod
Utahnax vannieri - stem-arthropod lobopod, also possible that is from Marjum Formation
Allonnia cf. tintinopsis - a chancelloriid
Chancelloria pentacta - chancelloriid coeloscleritophoran, perhaps a sponge?
Eldonia sp. - eldoniid paropsonemid cambroernid
Skeemella clavula - Possible vetulicolian
Hylolithellus sp. - annelid?
Wiwaxia corrugata - halwaxiid? lophotrochozoan
Yuknessia simplex - pterobranch
Margaretia dorus - possibly organic tube associated with hemichordate

References 

 
Geologic formations of Utah
Cambrian System of North America
Cambrian geology of Utah
Paleontology in Utah